Kristoffer Näfver (born 28 March 1986) is a Swedish footballer who plays for Rynninge IK. He is also the sports director at the club.

Career
Näfver started his career in Adolfsbergs IK and joined 2004 to Örebro SK. He played for Örebro SK until 2009, except for the second half of the 2008 season when he played on loan for Djurgårdens IF.

References

External links
 Eliteprospects profile
  (archive)

1986 births
Living people
Swedish footballers
Sweden international footballers
Allsvenskan players
Örebro SK players
Djurgårdens IF Fotboll players
Assyriska FF players
Landskrona BoIS players
BK Forward players
Motala AIF players
Rynninge IK players
Association football midfielders
Sportspeople from Örebro